Poymughangal is a 1973 Indian Malayalam-language film, directed by B. N. Prakash and produced by T. K. Balachandran. It stars Prem Nazir, Jayabharathi, Adoor Bhasi and Sreelatha Namboothiri. The film's score was composed by V. Dakshinamoorthy.

Cast 
Prem Nazir
Jayabharathi
Adoor Bhasi
Sreelatha Namboothiri
T. S. Muthaiah
Bahadoor
N. Govindankutty
Pala Thankam
Paravoor Bharathan
T. K. Balachandran

Soundtrack 
The music was composed by V. Dakshinamoorthy with lyrics written by P. Bhaskaran.

References

External links 
 

1973 films
1970s Malayalam-language films